Saen To may refer to several places in Thailand:

 Saen To, Mueang Uttaradit
 Saen To, Nam Pat
 Saen To, Tha Maka
 Saen To, Khanu Woralaksaburi